James Perry is an American football coach and former player. He is the head football coach at his alma mater, Brown University, where he was a starting quarterback in the late 1990s.

Biography
Perry is the youngest of seven children by Massachusetts hall of fame track and field coach Ernest Perry Jr. While a student at Malden Catholic High School, Perry played football, basketball, and track, receiving the Phelps Scholar-Athlete Award in 1996. He played quarterback at Brown, earning a number of school and Ivy League passing records. 

Perry served as the head coach at Bryant University from 2017 to 2018, where he posted a record of 12–10.

Honors and awards
 Phelps Scholar-Athlete Award, 1996
 Ivy League Player of the Year, 1999 
 Ivy League Bushnell Cup, 1999 
 Brown Athletic Hall of Fame, 2016

Head coaching record

References

External links
 Brown profile
 Bryant profile

Year of birth missing (living people)
Living people
American football quarterbacks
Brown Bears football coaches
Brown Bears football players
Bryant Bulldogs football coaches
Dartmouth Big Green football coaches
Delaware Fightin' Blue Hens football coaches
Malden Catholic High School alumni
Maryland Terrapins football coaches
Princeton Tigers football coaches
San Diego Toreros football coaches
Williams Ephs football coaches
People from Andover, Massachusetts
Sportspeople from Essex County, Massachusetts
Coaches of American football from Massachusetts
Players of American football from Massachusetts